Ele.me is the online food delivery and local life service platform of Alibaba Group. Founded in 2008, it is now the second largest online food delivery service platform in China.

History
Ele.me is an online-to-offline (O2O) catering and food delivery platform in China.  It was founded by Mark Zhang and Jack Kang in Minhang Campus of Shanghai Jiao Tong University in 2008 and now is developed and operated by Lazhasi Network Technology (Shanghai) Co., LTD. By the end of December in 2016, Ele.me has covered more than 2000 cities in China, with more than 1.3 million joining shops, 15 thousand staff and more than nine million daily orders. Also, over three million riders have registered Fengniao Delivery (the sub-service of Ele.me).

On 27 January 2015, Ele.me finished its Series E financing with $350 million invested by CITIC PE, Tencent Holdings, JD.com (Joybuy), Hongshan Capital (Sequoia Capital) and Dianping.com. On 28 August 2015, Ele.me announced the completion of its Series F financing with $630 million. The investment was led by CITIC PE and Hualian Group, followed  by new investors like China Media Capital (CMC), Gopher Asset as well as the original investors including Tencent Holdings, JD.com (Joybuy) and Hongshan Capital (Sequoia Capital).

On 24 November 2015, Ele.me obtained a strategic investment from Didi Chuxing. On 17 December 2015, Alibaba Group invested $1.25 billion to Ele.me.

On 1 March 2017, Ele.me announced that they would launch an app entitled "Food Security Service".  Restaurants that are suspected of violating the law will be synced to the supervision department, and this function now covers all the restaurants in Shanghai. On 8 March 2017, Ele.me announced that 5,257 restaurants were found to violate the rules and were removed within one week. Additionally, 258 restaurants were removed in Sichuan province.

By 2019, Ele.me had become the largest food delivery service in China with 53.4% market share. At the same time, the company increasingly attracted foreign retailers such as notably German supermarket chain ALDI,  expanding beyond pure food delivery to FMCG and grocery delivery as part of Alibaba Group's "New Retail" push.

Union
On 20 April 2017, under the support and guidance of Beijing Food and Drug Administration, major online meal ordering platforms including Ele.me, Meituan Dianping, Baidu Takeaway and Daojia established an online meal ordering platform self-discipline union voluntarily.

The CEOs of the four platforms made a statement and signed the "Self-discipline Convention on Online Takeaway Ordering Platform's Union" together. This convention promised solemnly to the society from 14 aspects including the proprietors’ pre-join promise, platform admission, and the improvement of the records management and information publicity of the proprietors. Its specific contents includes: establishing food security institutes and voluntarily publish information to the society on the homepages of the platforms; tightening the regulation of platform admission; submitting the management data and information to the Food and Drug Administration regularly and actively; taking linked supervision and punitive measures among the platforms, and simultaneously removing the restaurants that violate the rules from all the platforms; jointly strengthening the safety training of the riders; paying attention to improve the online advertising and the training of the proprietors; advertising and promoting the "Sunshine Food" project, etc.

Acquisition by Alibaba Group 
On 28 February 2018, it was announced that Alibaba Group was in talks to acquire Ele.me. On April 2, 2018, Alibaba acquired Ele.me for US$9.5 billion.

References

Further reading
 
Lei Y-W. 2021. "Delivering Solidarity: Platform Architecture and Collective Contention in China’s Platform Economy." American Sociological Review.

Alibaba Group
Online food ordering
Retail companies established in 2008
Transport companies established in 2008
Internet properties established in 2008
2018 mergers and acquisitions
Food and drink companies of China
Online retailers of China
Companies based in Shanghai
2008 establishments in China